Tawagu Pagoda is a Buddhist pagoda in Mandalay, Myanmar (Burma), located at the intersection of 82nd and 20th Streets in Aungmyethazan Township's Palengweyaung ward. The pagoda holds a pagoda festival in the Burmese month of Nadaw.

Establishment
The pagoda was erected by King Shwenankyawshin (1501–1527) during the Innwa era, at the site of a white elephant's abode. The pagoda was subsequently restored by Thibaw Min, the last king of Konbaung dynasty.

See also
Kuthodaw Pagoda
Sandamuni Pagoda
Setkyathiha Pagoda
Shwekyimyin Pagoda
Buddhism in Myanmar

References

Pagodas in Myanmar
Buddhist temples in Mandalay